Chauncey Hoyt Browning Sr. (May 15, 1903 – June 24, 1971) was Attorney General of West Virginia in 1952, and a justice of the Supreme Court of Appeals of West Virginia from August 18, 1952 until his death on June 24, 1971. Browning was a Democrat, from Logan County, West Virginia.

He was the father of West Virginia attorney general Chauncey H. Browning Jr.

He died of an apparent heart attack.

References

West Virginia Attorneys General
Justices of the Supreme Court of Appeals of West Virginia
1903 births
1971 deaths
People from Logan County, West Virginia
West Virginia Democrats
20th-century American judges